Walstonburg is a town in Greene County, North Carolina, United States. The population was 219 at the 2010 census. It is located north of Snow Hill on North Carolina Highway 91. The town is part of the Greenville Metropolitan Area.

History
The Titus W. Carr House and Speight-Bynum House are listed on the National Register of Historic Places.

Geography
Walstonburg is located in northern Greene County at  (35.595187, -77.697724). North Carolina Highway 91 leads south  to Snow Hill, the Greene County seat, and north  to U.S. Route 264 Alternate, which in turn leads east  to Greenville and northwest  to Wilson.

Demographics

As of the census of 2000, there were 224 people, 91 households, and 66 families residing in the town. The population density was 546.5 people per square mile (210.9/km). There were 101 housing units at an average density of 246.4 per square mile (95.1/km). The racial makeup of the town was 81.25% White, 15.62% African American, 2.23% from other races, and 0.89% from two or more races. Hispanic or Latino of any race were 2.23% of the population.

There were 91 households, out of which 27.5% had children under the age of 18 living with them, 60.4% were married couples living together, 7.7% had a female householder with no husband present, and 26.4% were non-families. 25.3% of all households were made up of individuals, and 7.7% had someone living alone who was 65 years of age or older. The average household size was 2.46 and the average family size was 2.90.

In the town, the population was spread out, with 23.2% under the age of 18, 6.3% from 18 to 24, 34.8% from 25 to 44, 23.2% from 45 to 64, and 12.5% who were 65 years of age or older. The median age was 37 years. For every 100 females, there were 109.3 males. For every 100 females age 18 and over, there were 102.4 males.

The median income for a household in the town was $36,875, and the median income for a family was $41,750. Males had a median income of $24,063 versus $22,250 for females. The per capita income for the town was $19,571. About 11.1% of families and 13.3% of the population were below the poverty line, including 4.0% of those under the age of eighteen and 6.9% of those 65 or over.

Education
The town is served by the Greene County Public School system,  with five schools located in nearby Snow Hill.

Transportation
The closest airport to Walstonburg is Pitt-Greenville Airport  with service to Charlotte Douglas International Airport, although most residents use Raleigh-Durham International Airport for domestic and international travel.

Highways that run through the area include NC 121 and NC 91.

Notable people
 Theodore Blue Edwards, former professional basketball player who competed in the NBA
 Eddie Lee Mays, the last person to be executed in New York

References

External links
 Non Profit Economic Development Group Serving Greene County, NC

Towns in Greene County, North Carolina
Towns in North Carolina
Greenville, North Carolina metropolitan area